Volkswagen Caravelle is the nameplate of a van based on the Volkswagen Transporter. For information about the Caravelle, refer to the regular Transporter articles:

Volkswagen Type 2 (1950–1979), the Caravelle version has a more comfortable interior reminiscent of passenger cars.
Volkswagen Type 2 (T3) (1979–1992), the Caravelle was a version in Europe and Australia.
Volkswagen Transporter (T4) (1992–2003), the Caravelle version was in Europe only and featured windows all-round.
Volkswagen Transporter (T5) (2003–2015), the Caravelle version is sold in European left-hand drive markets and in Australia. In the UK, the T5 Caravelle is the same as the MultiVan in other European markets.

Caravelle
Vans
Minivans